In photography, soft focus is a lens flaw, in which the lens forms images that are blurred due to spherical aberration. Soft Focus may also refer to:

 Soft Focus (album), a 2004 album by Euroboys
 Soft Focus (novel), a 2000 novel by Jayne Ann Krentz
 Soft Focus with Jena Friedman, a 2018 series of TV specials